VUV may stand for:

 Vacuum UV, ultraviolet radiation that is absorbed by air
 Vanuatu vatu (ISO 4217: VUV), the official currency of Vanuatu
 A nickname for the Vuvuzela horn, commonly used in soccer games